Paul Thompson is a British ice hockey head coach and general manager. He was head coach of the Great Britain men's national ice hockey team from 2006 to 2011. As of 2018, he is the winningest coach in the Elite Ice Hockey League, and has received nine Coach of the Year trophies in his career. His teams have won three Challenge Cups, two British Knockout Cups, and he is the first coach to win five Elite League titles. In the 2004–2005 season, Thompson completed the British Hockey Grand Slam; winning the Challenge Cup, the EIHL title, and the EIHL playoff championship. He served as the general manager and head coach of the Sheffield Steelers from 2015 to 2018, and previously coached 19 seasons with the Coventry Blaze organisation. He has coached professional teams in Denmark, Germany, Italy and Sweden; and has been the head coach of the Odense Bulldogs since 2021. He is known by the nickname "Thommo".

Professional coaching career

Beginnings in Solihull
Thompson began coaching a youth team in Solihull, then its reserve team, and then the Solihull Barons, which were renamed the Blaze in the following season. In his partial season coaching in Division 1, the Barons finished twelfth place. His first chance at coaching in the English Premier Ice Hockey League came in 1996–1997, with the Solihull Blaze. Thompson guided the team to a second-place finish in the season, but financial problems prevented the team from continuing into the playoffs. The team voluntarily dropped down to Division 1 in the NIHL for the 1997–1998 season, and then won the division, the league, and the playoffs, earning Thompson his first title as a coach. The Blaze returned to the EPIHL for the 1998–1999 season, and won the EPIHL championship and the playoffs. Solihull moved up to the British National League for the 1999–2000 season, placed seventh, and lost in the first round of the playoffs. Thompson won BNL Coach of the Year, his first of many awards.

Coventry years
In the 2000–2001 season, Solihull became the Coventry Blaze. Thompson improved the team to 4th in the league, but lost in the playoff round-robin. Thompson won the Coach of the Year Trophy awarded by the Ice Hockey Journalists UK. In the 2001–2002 season, Thompson again improved the team to a second-place finish, and reached the finals of the BNL playoffs. In the 2002–2003 season, Thompson coached Coventry to both the BNL season championship, and the playoff championship, and won another Coach of the Year Trophy. Coventry was a founding member of the Elite Ice Hockey League for the 2003–2004 season. In the new league, Thompson led the team to third place, but lost in the playoff round robin. The 2004–2005 season, was Thompson's most successful with the Blaze. He led Coventry to the EIHL championship, the EIHL playoff championship, and the EIHL Challenge Cup championship. Thompson also won another Coach of the Year Trophy. Thompson repeated the EIHL Challenge Cup championship in the 2005–2006 season, but finished fourth place in the league, and lost in the playoff round robin. In the 2006–2007 season, Thompson led Coventry to a third consecutive EIHL Challenge Cup championship, won the EIHL championship, and lost in the playoff semifinals to miss out on another grand slam, however the Blaze won the British Knockout Cup. Thompson was awarded another IHJUK Coach of the Year for his efforts. In the 2007–2008 season, Thompson led Coventry to the EIHL Charity Shield finals, won the EIHL championship, lost in the playoff finals, and won a second British Knockout Cup. Thompson was named both the IHJUK Coach of the Year, and the EIHL Coach of the Year. In the 2008–2009 season, he led Coventry to the EIHL Charity Shield championship, finished 2nd place in the league, and a loss in the playoff semifinals. Thompson and Coventry won the EIHL championship in the 2009–2010 season, but lost in the playoff semifinals, and in the Hocktoberfest finals He won his eighth Coach of The Year award. In the 2010–2011 season, Thompson's team dropped to 6th place in the league, and a loss in the first round of the playoffs, but were finalists in the EIHL Charity Shield. He improved the team to 5th place in the 2011–2012 season, but still lost in the first round of the playoffs. In the 2012–2013 season, he again improved the team to 4th in the league, and reached the second round of the playoffs.

Abroad in Europe
Thompson was the longest tenured head coach in British ice hockey when he announced his intentions to coach abroad in Europe for a new experience. Thompson joined Troja-Ljungby of the Allsvenskan league in Sweden for the 2013–2014 season. He was an assistant coach to Gunnar Leidborg, but with 12 games remaining he was promoted to head coach upon Leidborg's departure. The team was ultimately relegated to Hockeyettan after finished 13th in the season, and missing the top two spots in the qualifiers. Thompson stated he could have remained in Sweden, but wanted to move onto something else. Thompson moved to Denmark for the 2014–15 season, coaching the Aalborg Pirates of the Metal Ligaen. His team was primarily made of younger, local players. Aalborg finished eighth place in the season, and lost in the first round of the playoffs. After two years in Europe, Thompson returned to Great Britain, feeling that he learned a lot about hockey while abroad.

Sheffield years
On 30 April 2015, Thompson signed a two-year contract to be general manager and head coach of the Sheffield Steelers, and oversee the Under 20 programme. In the 2015–2016 season, Thompson led Sheffield to the EIHL championship, but were upset in the first round of the playoffs, by his old team Coventry. Thompson was awarded a ninth Coach of the Year Trophy, in his return to the EIHL. In the 2016–2017 season, he led the Steelers to third place in the league, won the EIHL playoff championship, and a spot in the EIHL Challenge Cup finals. On 12 April 2017, Thompson signed a two-year contract extension. In the 2017–2018 season, he led Sheffield to a third-place finish in the league, and reached the finals of the playoffs losing to the Cardiff Devils. Thompson resigned from his positions on 1 October 2018, citing personal reasons.

Schwenningen years
On 8 November 2018, Thompson signed a one-year contract as head coach of the Schwenninger Wild Wings in the Deutsche Eishockey Liga, with a club option for a second year. In the 2018–2019 season, he led the Wild Wings to 49 points but placed 14th and last overall. In his second season with the Wild Wings, Thompson was fired on 16 December 2019, with the team in 14th place and last overall with only six wins in 26 games.

Move to Italy
In October 2020, Thompson became head coach of the Unterland Cavaliers in Serie B of the Italian Hockey League.

Return to Denmark
Thompson was appointed as the head coach of the Odense Bulldogs in the Metal Ligaen in March 2021, on a contract until the end of the 2022–23 season.

Results and honours
As of 2018, Thompson is the winningest coach in the Elite Ice Hockey League, and has received nine Coach of the Year trophies in his career. His teams have won three Challenge Cups, two British Knockout Cups, and he is the first coach to win five Elite League titles. In the 2004–2005 season, Thompson completed the British Hockey Grand Slam; winning the Challenge Cup, the EIHL title, and the EIHL playoff championship.

International duties
Thompson was an assistant coach for the men's national ice hockey team in 2001, and 2002, and later became head coach of the men's national team from 2006 to 2011. In his fifth season as head coach of Team Great Britain, the Lions almost earned promotion to the top tier of the Ice Hockey World Championships. Great Britain won its final game against Poland to move into first place in Group B,  but earned a silver medal, when Kazakhstan scored a late goal against the host team Ukraine. Thompson planned on returning in 2012, but later resigned, and was replaced with Tony Hand.

Thompson headed a development forum for Ice Hockey UK, and led a proposal to create a domestic Under-20 League to develop the national talent pool. He believes that league structure used by the Danish Ice Hockey Union can be used for the Elite League, based on his experience coaching in the Metal Ligean. Thompson has stated a desire to give back to the English Ice Hockey Association, and was the keynote speaker, at the 2017 coaches conference hosted by the Junior League Management Committee, and the England National Team Programme.

International results

Personal life
Thompson was born on 5 April 1965, in Singapore, Malaysia. He had a brief playing career as a defenceman from 1987 to 1994, with the Solihull Barons, and the Sheffield Steelers. In 84 games, he scored 2 goals, and 17 assists.

Thompson is married, and has a son who played junior ice hockey.

In 2004, Thompson coauthored the book Benched: Blazing a Trail Through British Ice Hockey, a biography about his life in ice hockey.

In 2008, he received a Lifetime Achievement Award from Coventry, Solihull & Warwickshire sports, and an honorary Doctor of Science by Coventry University.

See also
Ice hockey in the United Kingdom

References

1965 births
Living people
British ice hockey coaches
British people of Singaporean descent
Deutsche Eishockey Liga coaches
English ice hockey defencemen
Great Britain men's national ice hockey team coaches
Sheffield Steelers players
Sportspeople from Singapore